The culture of Latvia combines traditional Latvian and Livonian heritage with influences of  the country's varied historical heritage.

History

The area of Latvia has been inhabited since 9000 BC. Baltic tribes, the ancestors of present-day Latvians, arrived around 3000 BC. In the 13th century after the conquest of today's Latvia, Baltic Germans settled here and gradually became the upper class and rulers of Latvia, while Latvians and Livonians lost their positions finally becoming serfs in the 16th century. This caused the Germanisation of the educated inhabitants of other nationalities, yet preserved some local traditions. In the 19th century, when serfdom was abolished, a Latvian nationalist movement, the First Latvian National Awakening, begun. Led by "Young Latvians", it encouraged Latvians to become artists and scholars, while preserving their cultural heritage and the language. The movement was countered by a period of Russification, followed by the leftist movement New Current at the beginning of the 20th century; it is regarded as a period in which Latvian culture thrived. This caused the second "Latvian National Awakening", leading ultimately to the proclamation of an independent Latvia in 1918.

On 15 May 1934, Kārlis Ulmanis seized power in a coup d'etat and established an authoritarian regime, which lasted only until the outbreak of World War II and Soviet occupation in 1939–40. In cultural terms, however, this period is seen as a "golden age" for Latvia. During the war, with a period of German occupation from 1941 to 1945, Latvia lost its de facto independence as it was occupied by the USSR and became the Latvian SSR. Soviet rule ended in 1991 during the third "Latvian National Awakening" and the restoration of independence.

People

The majority of inhabitants are Latvians. There is a culturally and linguistically distinct subgroup, the Latgalians, who inhabit the Latgale region in eastern Latvia. Another indigenous group are the Livonians, whose Finnic Livonian language is nearly extinct. The largest minority group is the Slavic people, notably Russians. Other well known minorities are Romani people, Baltic Germans and Jews, whose population decreased significantly after the Second World War, as well as Lithuanians and Estonians.

Languages

National Dress 

There are two distinct types of Latvian national costume, based on the historic period in which they arose: the "ancient dress" period from the 7th to 13th century, and the "ethnic" or "ethnographic dress" period from the 18th and 19th centuries.

One iconic feature of Latvian women's folk dress is the traditional Latvian belt, a wide sash with a woven geometric pattern. Different regions of Latvia have their own distinct patterns and colors.

The best known is the Lielvārde sash, or josta, a wide, red and white woven sash with a complicated pattern. Originating at a time before clothing had pockets, the sash was practical as it helped keep garments together and could be used for attaching items like keys or a knife. The sashes include signs and graphic symbols similar to ancient pictographs from Asia, and some scholars believe that these convey ancient coded information. The Lielvārde sash is so iconic that it appears in the nation's passports.

In modern times, national costumes are most often worn during the Song and Dance Festivals that take place every four years in Riga and on Midsummer Night, a popular national holiday celebrated on 23 June in Latvia.

Folklore
Latvians have the rich heritage of traditional folklore, especially folk songs, or Dainas. Dating back well over a thousand years, more than 1.2 million texts and 30,000 melodies of folk songs have been identified.

Culture Canon
Launched in 2007 and now complete, the Latvian Culture Canon was selected by a series of groups of experts in the areas of architecture and design, cinema, literature, music, stage art, national traditions and  visual arts. It contains a total of 99 works.

Cuisine

Religion 

Until the 12th century, Latvians were naturalists or otherwise known as pagans, Christianity arrived in the 12th and 13th century and was the most influential religion in the region until the arrival of Communism in the 20th century when all religions were banned. Today the majority of Latvians are part of the Lutheran Church with large Catholic and Orthodox Christian minorities.

Art 

 Cinema of Latvia

Literature

Music

Choir traditions are very strong in Latvia. Alongside many professional choirs, there are tens of thousands of Latvians who are part of different amateur choirs. Once every five years the Latvian National Song and Dance Festival takes place with around 20,000 singers taking part in it.

The 2014 World Choir Games took place in Riga.

In summer 2019 Latvia hosted the inaugural Riga Jurmala Music Festival, a new festival in which world-famous orchestras and conductors performed across four weekends during the summer. The festival took place at the Latvian National Opera, the Great Guild, and the Great and Small Halls of the Dzintari Concert Hall. This year features the Bavarian Radio Symphony Orchestra, the Israel Philharmonic Orchestra, the London Symphony Orchestra and the Russian National Orchestra.

Regions

Latvia is divided into several cultural and historical regions: Vidzeme, Latgale, Courland, Zemgale and Sēlija.

Architecture

A form of traditional architecture in Latvia is log houses. The position of houses differs among regions. In western Latvia, single farms are more popular and in villages, the houses are positioned in a circle around a central square. In eastern Latvia, villages are more popular and houses are positioned along the main street. This is seen as an influence of nearby Russia.

See also
 Latvian Gambit (in Chess)

References

External links